Antonio Bolognini (died 1461) was a Roman Catholic prelate who served as Bishop of Foligno (1444–1461) and Bishop of Nocera de' Pagani (1438–1444).

Biography
On 19 March 1438, Antonio Bolognini was appointed during the papacy of Pope Eugene IV as Bishop of Nocera de' Pagani.
On 31 August 1444, he was appointed during the papacy of Pope Eugene IV as Bishop of Foligno.
He served as Bishop of Foligno until his death in 1461.

While bishop, he was the principal co-consecrator of Francesco Oddi de Tuderto, Bishop of Assisi (1445).

References

External links and additional sources
 (for Chronology of Bishops) 
 (for Chronology of Bishops) 
 (for Chronology of Bishops) 
 (for Chronology of Bishops) 

15th-century Italian Roman Catholic bishops
Bishops appointed by Pope Eugene IV
1461 deaths
Bishops of Foligno